Chitra Bahadur K.C. is a Nepalese politician and Former Deputy Prime Minister and Minister of Poverty Alleviation Of Nepal. He is current chairman of the Rashtriya Jana Morcha.

Chitra Bahadur K.C. belonged to the Communist Party of Nepal (Fourth Convention). In the 1983 he sided with Mohan Bikram Singh, and joined the Communist Party of Nepal (Masal). Chitra Bahadur K.C. contested the Baglung-2 constituency in the 1994 election. He finished second, with 15089 votes. He was elected to the Pratinidhi Sabha in the 1999 election, as a candidate of Rashtriya Jana Morcha (the electoral front of the Communist Party of Nepal (Masal) (2006)) in the constituency of Baglung-2 with 24124 votes.

When Janamorcha Nepal was formed in 2002 through the merger of RJM and Samyukta Janamorcha Nepal, Chitra Bahadur K.C. became a member of JMN. When JMN split in 2006, he sided with Communist Party of Nepal (Unity Centre-Masal) (the parent party of JMN) general secretary Mohan Bikram Singh in rejecting participation the Seven Party Alliance government. Effectively JMN was split. A conference of the JMN led by Chitra Bahadur K.C. was held in Butwal 25–26 May 2006, in which he was elected chairman of this JMN faction. The Chitra Bahadur K.C.-led JMN was renamed as the Rashtriya Jana Morcha in 2007.

Chitra Bahadur K.C. won the Baglung-2 seat in the 2008 Constituent Assembly election, the sole RJM candidate to win a seat in the First Past the Post system. He got 12594 votes.

Chitra Bahadur K.C. has been a staunch opponent of Federalism, especially Federalism on the basis of ethnic identity.

References

Living people
Rastriya Janamorcha politicians
Communist Party of Nepal (Fourth Convention) politicians
Communist Party of Nepal (Masal) (historical) politicians
Deputy Prime Ministers of Nepal
Government ministers of Nepal
Nepal MPs 1999–2002
1934 births
Khas people
Members of the 1st Nepalese Constituent Assembly
Members of the 2nd Nepalese Constituent Assembly
Nepal MPs 2022–present